Lester Frank Ward (June 18, 1841 – April 18, 1913) was an American botanist, paleontologist, and sociologist. He served as the first president of the American Sociological Association.

In service of democratic development, polymath Lester Ward was the original American leader promoting the introduction of sociology courses into American higher education. His Enlightenment belief that institution-building could be scientifically informed was attractive to democratic intellectuals during the Progressive Era. To avoid anachronism and misinterpretation, it is crucial to understand that what "scientific" means, including scientists' own science concept, has long been contested. Ward's version of social science was based in organicist Enlightenment theories of comparative knowledge for democratic development, as distinguished from the mechanist version of science associated with Spencer's version of Sociology, and which later came to dominate the Anglo-American sciences and, along with micro symbolic interactionism and ethnography, sociology in the Cold War. Ward's significance is in deploying his scientific literacy, including his grasp of geological and biological sciences, to found American Sociology in an historical-materialist paradigm that avoided Cartesian dualism and efficiently distinguished democratic-developmentalist social institutions.  Ward's influence in certain circles (see: the Social Gospel) was also affected by his Enlightenment views regarding organized priesthoods, which he believed had been responsible for more evil than good throughout human history.

In the democratic Enlightenment tradition, Ward emphasized the importance of macro social forces which could be guided by the cultivation and use of democratic knowledge, in order to achieve progress toward democratic human development, justice, and security, rather than allowing "evolution"--understood as institionalized, mystified social power--to "take its own course," as proposed by elitists William Graham Sumner and Herbert Spencer. Like other sociological Enlightenment thinkers including Thomas Jefferson, Mary Wollstonecraft, Harriet Martineau, John Stuart Mill, and John Dewey, Ward emphasized universal and comprehensive public schooling to provide the public with the knowledge a democracy needs to successfully govern itself.

A collection of Ward's writings and photographs is maintained by the Special Collections Research Center of the George Washington University. The collection includes articles, diaries, correspondence, and a scrapbook. GWU's Special Collections Research Center is located in the Estelle and Melvin Gelman Library.

Biography
Most, if not all of what is known about Ward's early life comes from the definitive biography, Lester F. Ward: A Personal Sketch, written by Emily Palmer Cape in 1922, where she writes in the foreword:

Cape explained later in the foreword:

In a footnote on pp. 5–6, Cape notes: On February 20, 1911, in replying to my asking him to write his autobiography, he says: "I don't want to write my autobiography and have it appear while I am alive. It doesn't seem the thing to do. You are the one to write my biography from all the data that I shall leave, but it will be done after I have left them." (The "data" signified the diaries. The above italics are in Dr. Ward's letter.)

Early life
Lester Frank Ward was born in Joliet, Illinois, the youngest of 10 children born to Justus Ward and his wife Silence Rolph Ward. Justus Ward (d. 1858) was of old New England colonial stock, but he wasn't rich, and farmed to earn a living. Silence Ward was the daughter of a clergyman; she was a talented perfectionist, educated and fond of literature.

When Lester Frank was one year old, the family moved closer to Chicago, to a place called Cass, now known as Downers Grove, Illinois about twenty-three miles from Lake Michigan. The family then moved to a homestead in nearby St. Charles, Illinois where his father built a saw mill business making railroad ties.

Early education
Ward first attended a formal school at St. Charles, Kane County, Illinois, in 1850 when he was nine years old. He was known as Frank Ward to his classmates and friends and showed a great enthusiasm for books and learning, liberally supplementing his education with outside reading.

Four years after Ward started attending school, his parents, along with Lester and an older brother, Erastus, traveled to Iowa in a covered wagon for a new life on the frontier. Four years later, in 1858, Justus Ward unexpectedly died, and the boys returned the family to the old homestead they still owned in St. Charles. Ward's estranged mother, who lived two miles away with Ward's sister, disapproved of the move, and wanted the boys to stay in Iowa to continue their father's work.

The two brothers lived together for a short time in the old family homestead they dubbed "Bachelor's Hall," doing farm work to earn a living, and encouraged each other to pursue an education and abandon their father's life of physical labor.

In late 1858 the two brothers moved to Pennsylvania at the invitation of Lester Frank's oldest brother Cyrenus (9 years Lester Frank's senior), who was starting a business making wagon wheel hubs and needed workers. The brothers saw this as an opportunity to move closer to civilization and to eventually attend college.

The business failed, however, and Lester Frank, who still didn't have the money to attend college, found a job teaching in a small country school; in the summer months he worked as a farm laborer. He finally saved enough money to attend college and enrolled in the Susquehanna Collegiate Institute in 1860. While he was at first self-conscious about his spotty formal education and self learning, he soon found that his knowledge compared favorably to his classmates', and he was rapidly promoted.

Marriage and Civil War service
It was while attending the Susquehanna Collegiate Institute that he met Elizabeth "Lizzie" Carolyn Vought (some sources cite Bought) and fell deeply in love. Their "rather torrid love affair" was documented in Ward's first journal Young Ward's Diary. They married on August 13, 1862.

Almost immediately afterward, Ward enlisted in the Union Army and was sent to the Civil War front where he was wounded three times. After the end of the war he successfully petitioned for work with the federal government in Washington, DC, where he and Lizzie then moved.

Lizzie assisted him in editing a newsletter called "The Iconoclast," dedicated to free thinking and attacks on organized religion. She gave birth to a son, but the child died when he was less than a year old. Lizzie died in 1872. Rosamond Asenath Simons was married to Lester Frank Ward as his second wife in the year 1873.

College
After moving to Washington, Ward attended Columbian College, now the George Washington University, and graduating in 1869 with the degree of A.B. In 1871, after he received the degree of LL.B, he was admitted to the Bar of the Supreme Court of the District of Columbia. In 1873, he completed his A.M. degree.

Research career and U.S. Geologic Survey
Ward never practiced law, however, and concentrated on his work as a researcher for the federal government. At that time almost all of the basic research in such fields as geography, paleontology, archaeology and anthropology were concentrated in Washington, DC, and a job as a federal government scientist was a prestigious and influential position. In 1883 he was made Geologist of the U.S. Geological Survey.

While he worked at the Geological Survey he became good friends with John Wesley Powell, the powerful and influential second director of the US Geological Survey (1881–1894) and the director of the Bureau of Ethnology at the Smithsonian Institution.

Brown University Chair of Sociology
In 1892, he was named Paleontologist for the USGS, a position he held until 1906, when he resigned to accept the chair of Sociology at Brown University.

Works and ideas
In the early 1880s, Enlightenment, Counterenlightenment and Antienlightenment struggles continued over the extent of democratic versus elite institutions necessary and sufficient to advance justice and security. The British champion of the conservatives and businessmen was Herbert Spencer, innovating Social Darwinism to argue for social, economic, and political inequality. Spencer was opposed by the Historical materialism of Karl Marx. Ward worked for team democratic Enlightenment in the ongoing contest. He strategized to defuse mobilized conservative-liberal opposition to Marx in the United States while furthering democracy; so he deployed his scientific literacy to contribute an American version of historical-materialist Sociology. With the publication of the two-volume, 1,200-page, Dynamic Sociology: Or Applied Social Science as Based Upon Statistical Sociology and the Less Complex Sciences (1883), Lester Ward hoped to bring scientific epistemology to the struggle for democracy in the United States. For Ward science wasn't cold or impersonal; it was human-centered and results-oriented. As he put it in the Preface to Dynamic Sociology, "The real object of science is to benefit man. A science which fails to do this, however agreeable its study, is lifeless. Sociology, which of all sciences should benefit man most, is in danger of falling into the class of polite amusements, or dead sciences. It is the object of this work to point out a method by which the breath of life may be breathed into its nostrils."

Spencer's twist on Darwinism argued that inequality is inevitable and proper because Nature requires social, political, and economic inequality, inegalitarian institutions and dispositions. Against such antidemocratic efforts to naturalize inequality with the end of Reconstruction and the rise of the Gilded Age, Ward argued that empirically and theoretically, poverty can be minimized or eliminated by systematic intervention. Historically and cross-culturally, humankind has not been helpless before "impersonal" forces of nature and evolution disconnected from human collective action. Whether in elite-ruled networks or through democratic relations, agential humans can and do collectively take control of their institutions and direct the development of human society. In the historical political contest with inegalitarian naturalism, Ward's classic Enlightenment approach has sometimes been labeled telesis (Also see: meliorism, sociocracy and public sociology). A Sociology which intelligently and scientifically directed the social and economic development of society should contribute knowledge to instituting a universal and comprehensive system of education, regulating competition, connecting the people on the basis of equal opportunities and cooperation, and promoting the happiness and the freedom of everyone.

Criticism of laissez-faire
Ward is most often remembered for his relentless attack on Herbert Spencer and Spencer's theories of laissez-faire and survival of the fittest that dominated inegalitarian socio-economic thought in the United States after the American Civil War over slavery. Spencer was a leading light for conservatives and for many elites who considered themselves to be progressive for their day, while the American ruling class rejected the historical-materialist emphasis on democratic human development furthered in Marxism and the related Sociology of W.E.B. Du Bois. Ward placed himself in direct opposition to Spencer and Spencer's American disciple William Graham Sumner, who had become the most well known and widely read American Political Scientist by single-mindedly promoting the principles of laissez-faire. To quote the historian Henry Steele Commager: "Ward was the first major scholar to attack this whole system of negativist and absolutist sociology and he remains the ablest.... Before Ward could begin to formulate that science of society which he hoped would inaugurate an era of such progress as the world had not yet seen, he had to destroy the superstitions that still held domain over the mind of his generation. Of these, laissez-faire was the most stupefying, and it was on the doctrine of laissez-faire that he trained his heaviest guns. The work of demolition performed in Dynamic Sociology, Psychic Factors and Applied Sociology was thorough."

Welfare state
Ward was a strong supporter of the concept of the welfare state, or state aid for those in need of it. He fiercely criticized those who criticized
such policies as paternalistic, writing that the primary critics of state aid for the indigent were the wealthy classes who themselves lobbied for government assistance for their failing enterprises:

The charge of paternalism is chiefly made by the class that enjoys the largest share of government protection. Those who denounce it are those who most frequently and successfully invoke it. Nothing is more obvious today than the signal inability of capital and private enterprise to take care of themselves unaided by the state; and while they are incessantly denouncing "paternalism," by which they mean the claim of the defenseless laborer and artisan to a share in this lavish state protection, they are all the while besieging legislatures for relief from their own incompetency, and "pleading the baby act" through a trained body of lawyers and lobbyists. The dispensing of national pap to this class should rather be called "maternalism," to which a square, open, and dignified paternalism would be infinitely preferable.

Female equality
Ward was a strong advocate for equal rights for women and even theorized, in a typical witty and acerbic pre-Cold War rhetorical style that can be difficult for undergraduates and antifeminists to appreciate, that women are naturally superior to men ("Our Better Halves," 1922). Ward contributed to the sociological feminist revival pioneered by Mary Wollstonecraft and Charles Fourier beginning in the 17th century. Deploying his biological expertise, Ward's take-down of patriarchal inegalitarianism and its crippling effect on both women and men's human development is consanguine with Virginia Woolf's feminist argument in Three Guineas (1938), though it can be anachronistically associated with the difference feminism of writers such as Harvard's Carol Gilligan, who have developed claims of female superiority. Ward is considered a feminist writer by contemporary historians such as Ann Taylor Allen, and a feminist Sociologist by contemporary Sociologists such as Michael Kimmel. 

This is a sample of the sort of confident and withering narrative style that in its deployment against patriarchal inequality can offend antifeminists: "And now from the point of view of intellectual development itself we find her side by side, and shoulder to shoulder with him furnishing, from the very outset, far back in prehistoric, presocial, and even prehuman times, the necessary complement to his otherwise one-sided, headlong, and wayward career, without which he would soon have warped and distorted the race and rendered it incapable of the very progress which he claims exclusively to inspire," Ward wrote in 1922. "And herefore again, even in the realm of intellect, where he would fain reign supreme, she has proved herself fully his equal and is entitled to her share of whatever credit attaches to human progress hereby achieved." 

Clifford H. Scott claims that "practically all the suffragists ignored" Ward, but Scott is focused on the Progressivist upper-class suffragists who were taken by the inegalitarian Social Darwinist and eugenicist ideologies of the day. Their ambition for liberation was smaller than Ward's feminism.

Environmental policy in the US
Ward had a considerable influence on the United States' environmental policy in the late 19th and early 20th century. Ross listed Ward among the four "philosopher/scientists" that shaped American early environmental policies. (see: Ross, John R.; Man over Nature)

White supremacy and race
Ward was a Republican Whig and supported the abolition of the American system of slavery. He enlisted in the Union Army during the Civil War and was wounded three times. However, a close reading of his Dynamic Sociology will uncover several statements that would be considered somewhat racist and ethnocentric by today's standards. There are references to the superiority of Western culture and the savagery of the American Indian and black races, made all the more jarring by the modern feel of much of the rest of the book.

However, Ward lived in Washington D.C., then the center of anthropological research in the US; he was always up-to-date on the latest findings of science and in tune with the developing Zeitgeist, and by the early twentieth century, perhaps influenced by W.E.B. Du Bois and German-born Franz Boas, he began to focus more on the question of race.

During this period his views on race were arguably more progressive and in tune with modern standards than any other white academic of the time. In the 1870s, as editor of the Iconoclast, he published articles by Frederick Douglas and he was involved in the founding of Howard University. Later, while Charlotte Perkins Gilman and many sociologists supported the eugenics movement, he vigorously opposed it. Later Franz Boaz perhaps even more strongly combated the theory of white supremacy.

Organicism
Science was co-opted by the military in the Cold War US, which reduced Americans' understanding of science to positivist-mechanism, in competition with the Soviet Union's sponsorship of organicist science, as that country raced to modernize agriculture and so prioritized faster crop development. The legacy of this Cold War science competition, as it impacts our understanding of Ward's work, is that his historical-materialist organicism was often dismissed as Lamarckian, which was a big put-down on the American side of the Cold War. 20th century American science was not autonomous scholarship, and had to walk a line between quickly and effectively developing destructive technologies and affirming the natural inevitability of the outcomes of social inequality. Because science in the United States was directed by the military to weapons-development and "crowd" suppression, there was little tolerance for learning about how organisms respond to their environment, a research agenda that contra inegalitarian imperial capitalism, implied that not only does the human construction of environments matter, but also, and more objectionably to military and capitalist elites, that humans and other organisms suffer when their environments are constructed around the interests of a human elite. Ward's article "Neo-Darwinism and Neo-Lamarckism" shows Ward had a sophisticated understanding of this subject. He clearly described himself as being a Neo-Lamarckian, and as an Enlightenment scientist, he completely and enthusiastically accepted Darwin's findings and theories. 

The military domination of American science in the Cold War was an unalloyed boon to Physics and Chemistry, but it was more repressive in Biology. When the Soviet Union was folded and as the Cold War reverted to the Great Game, American geneticists were freed to recognize epigenetics, and Ward was vindicated. Ward thought that empirical evidence indicated that there had to be a mechanism that would allow environmental factors to influence evolution faster than Darwin's slow evolutionary process. The science of epigenetics suggests that Ward was correct, although hard-core inegalitarian scientists continue to ridicule Larmarkianism. A study of Lester Ward and his opponents can be a study of how our understanding of science, with its modern roots in the Renaissance and revolutionary-era Western Enlightenment, has often been distorted by powerful efforts to make it serve imperial capitalist- militarism and its inegalitarian, undemocratic governance mode. In its home court of democratic knowledge development, scientific validity is a competitive alternative to elite Truth, and that is why the knowledge of democratic historical-materialists like Lester Ward stand the test of time.

Positivism
While Durkheim is usually credited for updating Comte's positivism to modern scientific and sociological standards, Ward accomplished much the same thing 10 years earlier in the United States. However, Ward would be the last person to claim that his contributions were somehow unique or original to him. As Gillis J. Harp points out in The Positivist Republic, Comte's positivism found a fertile ground in the democratic republic of the United States, and there soon developed among the pragmatic intellectual community in New York City, which featured such thinkers as William James and Charles Sanders Peirce, as well as among federal government scientists like Ward in Washington, D.C., a consensus regarding positivism.

Theory of war and conflict
In Pure Sociology: A Treatise on the Origin and Spontaneous Development of Society (1903) Ward theorizes that throughout human history conflict and war have been the forces that are most responsible for human progress. It was through conflict that hominids gained dominance over animals. It was through conflict and war that Homo Sapiens wiped out the less advanced hominid species, and it was through war that the more technologically advanced races and nations expanded their territory and spread civilization. Ward sees war as a natural evolutionary process and like all natural evolutionary processes war is capricious, slow, often ineffective and shows no regard for the pain inflicted on living creatures. One of the central tenets of Ward's world view is that the artificial is superior to the natural and thus one of the central goals of Applied Sociology is to replace war with a system that retains the progressive elements that war has provided but without the many miseries it inflicts.

Influence on U.S. government policy
Ward influenced a rising generation of progressive political leaders, such as Herbert Croly. In the book Lester Ward and the Welfare State, Commager details Ward's influence and refers to him as the "father of the modern welfare state".

As a political approach, Ward's system became sometimes known as social liberalism, distinguished from the classical liberalism of the eighteenth and nineteenth centuries associated with such thinkers as Adam Smith and John Stuart Mill. While classical liberalism had sought prosperity and progress through laissez-faire (a "natural" state of stratified relations achieved by the restriction of state and legal patronage to elite economic interests), Ward's "American social liberalism" sought to enhance social progress through direct government "intervention" (as laissez-faire proponents see it) or state accountability to the diverse working-class, as egalitarians like Ward understand it. Like many Enlightenment and revolutionary thinkers before him (Rousseau for example), Ward believed that in large, complex and rapidly growing societies, inclusive human freedom (egaliberte) could only be achieved with the assistance of a strong democratic government acting in the balanced interests of universal individual development. The element of Ward's thinking that has most alarmed his inegalitarian and anarchist opponents was his confidence that a government, acting on the empirical findings and scientific theory of the science of Sociology, could be diverted from elite domination and patronage and harnessed instead to create democratic justice and security. Ward's work toward this end was exploded in the Cold War, when wartime collaboration with US commercial elites persisted to permit the military to harness American science (Hogan, 1998), and Sociology was rebuilt around a new quantitative positivism-mechanism and micro research and theory agendas suggested by Austro-Hungarian Empire philosopher Georg Simmel and implemented under the leadership of White Russian expat Pitirim Sorokin.

Progressive thinking had a profound impact on the administrations of Presidents Theodore Roosevelt, Woodrow Wilson, Franklin D. Roosevelt and Lyndon B. Johnson and on the liberal wing of the modern Democratic Party. Ward's ideas were in the air but there are few direct links between his writings and the actual programs of the founders of the welfare state and the New Deal.

Ward's diaries
All but the first of his voluminous diaries were reportedly destroyed by his wife after his death. Ward's first journal, Young Ward's Diary: A Human and Eager Record of the Years Between 1860 and 1870..., remains under copyright.

Ward died in Washington, D.C. He is buried in Watertown, New York.

Literature
 
 
 
 
 
 
 Coser, Lewis. A History of Sociological Analysis. New York : Basic Books.
 Dahms, Harry F. – 'Lester F. Ward'
 Finlay, Barbara. "Lester Frank Ward as a Sociologist Of Gender: A New Look at His Sociological Work." Gender & Society, Vol. 13, No. 2, 251–265 (1999)
 Gossett, Thomas F. (1963) – Race: The History of an Idea in America.
 Harp, Gillis J. Positivist Republic, Ch. 5 "Lester F. Ward: Positivist Whig" Positivist Republic: Auguste Comte and the Reconstruction of American Liberalism, 1865–1920
 Hofstadter, Richard. Social Darwinism in American Thought, Chapter 4, (original 1944, 1955. reprint Boston: Beacon Press, 1992). Social Darwinism in American Thought
 Largey, Gale. Lester Ward: A Global Sociologist 
 Mers, Adelheid. Fusion 
 Perlstadt, Harry. Applied Sociology as Translational Research: A One Hundred Fifty Year Voyage 
 Rafferty, Edward C. 'Apostle of Human Progress. Lester Frank Ward and American Political Thought, 1841/1913. https://books.google.com/books?id=4Q_5F1gu-mMC&source=gbs_navlinks_s
 Ravitch, Diane. Left Back: A Century of Failed School Reforms. Simon & Schuster. "Chapter one: The Educational Ladder" https://www.nytimes.com/books/first/r/ravitch-back.html
 Ross, John R. Man over Nature: the origins of the conservation movement https://journals.ku.edu/index.php/amerstud/article/view/2348/2307
 Ross, Dorthy. The Origins of American Social Science. Cambridge University Press https://books.google.com/books?id=rg4blh6xmhIC&pg=PA85
 Seidelman, Raymond and Harpham, Edward J. Disenchanted Realists: Political Science and the American Crisis, 1884–1984. p. 26 https://books.google.com/books?id=09-ZDrzUz-gC&printsec=frontcover&source=gbs_v2_summary_r&cad=0
 Wood, Clement. The Sociology Of Lester F Ward https://archive.org/details/sociologyofleste033176mbp

Selected works
Linked here are facsimiles of original editions, which also include links to JSTOR conversions (where available), along with several alternate formats.

For modernized copies in pdf format, see those under external links below, which were photocopied and proofread by Ralf Schreyer and are the best quality you can find on the internet.

1880–1889
 
 
 
 
 

1890–1899
 
  (reprinted 1906)
 
 
 
 
 
 
 
 
 
 
 
 
  (reprinted 1913)

1900–1909
 
 
 
 (1903) "Pure Sociology: A Treatise on the Origin and Spontaneous Development of Society." (2,625 KB – PDF)
  With the collaboration of William M. Fontaine, Arthur Bibbins, and G. R. Wieland
  With the collaboration of William M. Fontaine, Arthur Bibbins, and G. R. Wieland
 
 
 

1910–1919
 
 
 
 
 
 
 

See also
 History of feminism

References

Further reading
Primary sources
 Commager, Henry Steele, ed., Lester Frank Ward and the Welfare State (1967), major writings by Ward, and long introduction by Commager
 Stern, Bernhard J. ed. Young Ward's Diary: A Human and Eager Record of the Years Between 1860 and 1870 as They Were Lived in the Vicinity of the Little Town of Towanda, Pennsylvania; in the Field as a Rank and File Soldier in the Union Army; and Later in the Nation's Capital, by Lester Ward Who became the First Great Sociologist This Country Produced (1935)

Secondary sources
   Bannister, Robert. Sociology and Scientism: The American Quest for Objectivity, 1880–1940 (1987), pp. 13–31.
 Burnham, John C. "Lester Frank Ward as Natural Scientist," American Quarterly 1954 6#3 pp. 259–265 in JSTOR
 Chugerman, Samuel. Lester F. Ward, the American Aristotle: A Summary and Interpretation of His Sociology (Duke University Press, 1939)
 Fine, Sidney. Laissez Faire and the General-Welfare State: A Study of Conflict in American Thought, 1865–1901 (1956), pp. 252–288
 Muccigrosso, Robert, ed. Research Guide to American Historical Biography (1988) 3:1570–1574
 Nelson, Alvin F. "Lester Ward's Conception of the Nature of Science," Journal of the History of Ideas (1972) 33#4 pp. 633–638 in JSTOR

 Piott, Steven L.  American Reformers, 1870-1920: Progressives in Word and Deed (2006); examines 12 leading activists; see chapter 1 for Ward.
 Scott, Clifford H. Lester Frank Ward'' (1976)

External links

Primary sources

 Guide to the Lester Frank Ward Collection, 1860–1913, Brown University Library Collections
 Guide to the Lester Frank Ward Papers, 1883–1919, Special Collections Research Center, Estelle and Melvin Gelman Library, the George Washington University

Secondary sources
 
 The Sunday Review; Towanda, Pennsylvania
 Short biography 
 A Lester Ward web site
 Public Sociology website
 Mansfield University Sociology professor Gale Largey produced a 90 minute documentary on Lester Frank Ward that was featured at the 2005 Centennial of the American Sociological Association and is available upon request from the director.
 
 
 

1841 births
1913 deaths
American sociologists
Writers from Joliet, Illinois
Lamarckism
Presidents of the American Sociological Association
Male feminists
19th-century American writers
20th-century American writers
Brown University faculty